Delta is an Indian homegrown networking and support app for the LGBT community in India. The app allows members of the LGBTQ community to find friendly spaces and professionals but no one ever paid any attention to it. It was developed by Ishaan Sethi.

References 

LGBT in India
Mobile social software
Online dating services of India
Same sex online dating